Jang Thill (23 January 1913 – 26 November 1984) was a Luxembourgian painter. His work was part of the painting event in the art competition at the 1936 Summer Olympics.

References

1913 births
1984 deaths
20th-century Luxembourgian painters
20th-century male artists
Olympic competitors in art competitions
People from Luxembourg City
Male painters